Liana Millu (born Millul; Pisa, 21 December 1914 – 6 February 2005) was a Jewish-Italian journalist, World War II resistance fighter and Holocaust survivor.  She is best known for her autobiography Smoke over Birkenau.

Biography 
Millu was raised by her grandparents, and spent most of her life in Genoa. Her surname at birth was Millul, but she later changed it to Millu for her pseudonym. She worked as a journalist for Il Telegrafo and schoolteacher. 

In 1943, Millu joined the Italian partisans.  She was arrested in 1944 and deported to Auschwitz-Birkenau in Poland.

After the war, Millu returned to Italy and became an author.  Her work is included in the Italian anthology, Twentieth-Century Ligurian Writers.

Works
Smoke over Birkenau (translated by novelist Lynne Sharon Schwartz, who won the 1991 PEN Renato Poggioli translation award; 1994) – 
The Bridges of Schwerin (novel), winner of the 1978 Viareggio Prize
 Josephia's Shirt (collection of stories) 
From Liguria to the Extermination Camps (non-fiction)

References

See also
Primo Levi

1914 births
2005 deaths
20th-century Italian Jews
Italian memoirists
Italian resistance movement members
Jewish writers
Auschwitz concentration camp survivors
Women memoirists
Italian women novelists
Fossoli camp survivors
20th-century Italian novelists
20th-century Italian women writers
Jewish women writers
Jewish partisans
Female resistance members of World War II
20th-century memoirists
Writers from Genoa